Fair Exchange may refer to:

 Fair Exchange (film), a 1936 British film directed by Ralph Ince
 Fair Exchange (TV series), an American television comedy